Hélène Perrin (born 1972) is a French physicist working on quantum gas at Laser Physics Laboratory of Université Sorbonne Paris Nord and CNRS, where she is a research  director and leads the Bose-Einstein Condensate group.

Education and career 
Hélène Perrin studied physics and engineering at the Ecole Polytechnique after studying at Lycée Louis-le-Grand, and pursued a master's degree in quantum physics at Ecole Normale Superieure, before pursuing a doctorate within Claude Cohen-Tannoudji's group on the topic of ultracold atoms,  which she completed in 1998. She then joined the French Alternative Energies and Atomic Energy Commission as a postdoctoral fellow before becoming a CNRS staff scientist in 1999.

References

External links

1972 births
Living people
Quantum physicists
French physicists
French women physicists
École Polytechnique alumni
Research directors of the French National Centre for Scientific Research